Klokotnitsa (also transliterated Klokotnica) may refer to:

Klokotnitsa, Haskovo Province, a village in Bulgaria
Battle of Klokotnitsa, 1230
Klokotnitsa Ridge

See also
Klokotnica (disambiguation) (Клокотница)
Klokot (disambiguation)
Klokočevac (disambiguation)